The Luzon Building was a historic six-story building at 1302 Pacific Avenue in downtown Tacoma, Washington designed by Chicago architects Daniel Burnham and John Root.

The Luzon was built in 1890–1891 as the Pacific National Bank, which had a first floor entrance on Pacific Avenue and a second floor entrance on Commerce Street.  Both floors contained businesses such as W.L. Davis & Sons Co. Furniture and Chaddy & Son Tailors in addition to the bank; the upper four stories were living space.

The building was named "Luzon" in 1901, after the largest island in the Philippines, where on July 1 of that year William Howard Taft inaugurated establishment of American civil government of the Philippines.

The building was demolished on September 26, 2009, despite efforts by local preservationists.

References 

Commercial buildings completed in 1891
Buildings and structures demolished in 2009
Buildings and structures in Tacoma, Washington
Demolished buildings and structures in Washington (state)
Burnham and Root buildings
Bank buildings on the National Register of Historic Places in Washington (state)
Chicago school architecture in Washington (state)
Pierce County, Washington
National Register of Historic Places in Tacoma, Washington